Hebron Church is an evangelical church in Long Ashton, North Somerset, near Bristol in England, was first founded in 1934 by Ernest Dyer.

The church arose out of a Sunday school and youth club by Mr Dyer, who cycled weekly from the Somerdale Factory in Keynsham to run the clubs. Mr Dyer lived above the Church until his death in 1967. His sister continued living there until her subsequent death. The church was named “Hebron” because an aim was for it to be a “place of refuge”.

During the 1930s and 1940s, Dr Vernon Charley, who developed the blackcurrant drink Ribena whilst at the Long Ashton Research Station, was the organist and an elder of the church. During the 1950s, Roger T. Forster, founder of Ichthus Christian Fellowship was a regular preacher whilst doing National Service with the RAF.

The church continues to thrive and membership currently stands at around 30 with an average Sunday morning congregation of around 50. Evening services are smaller with an average of around 15 attendees. Hebron is an exciting mixture of people from varied backgrounds:- Baptist, Methodist, Pentecostal, Salvation Army, Anglican and Roman Catholic. Ages range from the cradle to the 90s.  Children's and youth work continues with regular groups for all ages including "God's Gang" and a Friday night kid's club.

As a church we want to grow in our relationship with God and to invite other people to discover Him for themselves. We believe that God revealed Himself in the life of Jesus to make all this possible. We aim to be a church where all people can feel welcome and can know that they 'belong'.

References

External links
 Church web site

Churches in Somerset
Churches in North Somerset
Evangelical churches in the United Kingdom